is a Japanese manga series written by Togo Goto and illustrated by Kento Matsuura. It was serialized in Shueisha's Weekly Shōnen Jump from August 2020 to April 2021, with its chapters collected in four tankōbon volumes. It was published digitally in English by Viz Media and Manga Plus.

Plot
The story follows Iori Katanagi, a shaman who is very unmotivated to do his job. However, upon meeting Riku Aibetsu, he may have a chance to find a long lost foe.

Characters

Iori is unmotivated, lazy and obnoxious. He hates being a shaman and desires to be normal, but is often forced to do jobs by his sister. However, he is a caring person deep down, who will protect people, even if it costs his life. He has tamed the phantom Ongyoki, which gives him power over shadows. He despises Senjudoji and wants to destroy her out of anger for killing someone close to him.

Riku is a girl who likes helping people. At first, she thought she had the sixth sense to detect danger, when in reality, she is a Beckoning Hand, meaning she attracts phantoms. However, this does not weaken her resolve and even begins training to be a shaman so she can help people.

Iori's older sister. She is a powerful shaman and has multiple abilities, including clairvoyance, mind reading and the ability to obliterate phantoms. She often forces her brother to do jobs. She is often seen smiling and has a slightly playful personality. Her Phantom's abilities are related to eyes.

Kenma is gentlemanly, respectful and serious, the exact opposite of Iori. He wants Iori to take his job more seriously. He has tamed Tengu, which allows him to manipulate sound waves.

The self proclaimed "Young Star of the Shaman World". He is flashy and is usually seen flirting with women, but takes his job as a Shaman seriously. He has an unnamed phantom that grants him pyrokinetic abilities, but only if he has a source, such as a lighter.
Senjudoji
Senjudoji is a phantom that takes the form of a little girl. She is sadistic, cruel and arrogant. She is currently hunting Beckoning Hands.

Publication
Phantom Seer is written by Togo Goto and illustrated by Kento Matsuura. Matsuura previously illustrated the manga Tokyo Shinobi Squad. The one-shot version was previously published in Shueisha's Jump GIGA in 2017, and in Weekly Shōnen Jump in September of the following year, where it won the 2018 Golden Future Cup competition. Phantom Seer was serialized in Weekly Shōnen Jump from August 31, 2020 to April 5, 2021. Shueisha collected its chapters in four individual tankōbon volumes, released on December 4, 2020 to July 2, 2021.

The series was published digitally in English language by Viz Media and Manga Plus. In February 2022, Viz Media announced that they will be releasing volumes digitally, with all volumes being released on August 23, 2022.

Volume list

Reception
In December 2020, it was reported that the first volume of Phantom Seer performed well, as their initial amount printed sold out leading to a reprint.

References

External links
 

Action anime and manga
Horror anime and manga
Shōnen manga
Shueisha manga
Viz Media manga